Rose Constance Leveson-Gower, Countess Granville  (née Bowes-Lyon; 6 May 1890 – 17 November 1967) was the third daughter of the 14th Earl of Strathmore and Kinghorne by his wife, Cecilia Cavendish-Bentinck.  An elder sister of Queen Elizabeth The Queen Mother, she was therefore a maternal aunt of Queen Elizabeth II.

Life and family
On 24 May 1916, Lady Rose Bowes-Lyon married The Hon. William Leveson-Gower, who succeeded to his childless brother's earldom on 21 July 1939. As a result, she was styled as Countess Granville.

The couple had two children, Lady Mary Cecilia (12 December 1917 – 13 February 2014) and Granville James Leveson-Gower, 5th Earl Granville (6 December 1918 – 31 October 1996). She stood godmother to her niece, Princess Margaret Rose of York, at the latter's christening on 3 October 1930.

Lady Mary Cecilia Leveson-Gower (12 December 1917 – 13 February 2014), who married Sir Samuel Clayton (8 January 1918 – February 2004) on 7 July 1956 and had issue. Their daughter is polar adventurer Rosie Stancer. 
Granville James Leveson-Gower, 5th Earl Granville (6 December 1918 – 31 October 1996), who married Doon Aileen Plunket (1931–2003) on 9 October 1958 and had issue.

She stood godmother to her niece, Princess Margaret Rose of York, at the latter's christening on 3 October 1930. She was invested as a Companion of the Most Venerable Order of the Hospital of St John of Jerusalem (C.St.J.). She was also awarded the honorary degree of Doctor of Laws (LL.D.) by Queen's University Belfast. In 1953, she was invested as a Dame Grand Cross of the Royal Victorian Order (GCVO).

Her husband died on 25 June 1953, aged 72. She outlived him by fourteen years when she died on 17 November 1967, aged 77. She was the last surviving sibling of Queen Elizabeth The Queen Mother.

Ancestry

References

1890 births
1967 deaths
Rose Leveson-Gower
Commanders of the Order of St John
Dames Grand Cross of the Royal Victorian Order
Daughters of British earls
Daughters of Scottish earls
Rose Leveson-Gower
British countesses
19th-century Scottish people
19th-century Scottish women
20th-century Scottish people
20th-century Scottish women